The bronze coqui, Richmond's coqui, coquí caoba or coquí de Richmond (Eleutherodactylus richmondi), is a species of frog in the family Eleutherodactylidae. The specific epithet, richmondi, is dedicated to Dr. Charles W. Richmond.

It is endemic to Puerto Rico, and its natural habitats are subtropical or tropical moist lowland forest and subtropical or tropical moist montane forest.

See also

Fauna of Puerto Rico
List of endemic fauna of Puerto Rico
List of amphibians and reptiles of Puerto Rico

References

Eleutherodactylus
Amphibians described in 1904
Taxa named by Leonhard Stejneger
Amphibians of Puerto Rico
Endemic fauna of Puerto Rico
Taxonomy articles created by Polbot